A stratovolcano, also known as a composite volcano, is a conical volcano built up by many layers (strata) of hardened lava and tephra. Unlike shield volcanoes, stratovolcanoes are characterized by a steep profile with a summit crater and periodic intervals of explosive eruptions and effusive eruptions, although some have collapsed summit craters called calderas. The lava flowing from stratovolcanoes typically cools and hardens before spreading far, due to high viscosity. The magma forming this lava is often felsic, having high-to-intermediate levels of silica (as in rhyolite, dacite, or andesite), with lesser amounts of less-viscous mafic magma.

Stratovolcanoes are sometimes called composite volcanoes because of their composite stratified structure, built up from sequential outpourings of erupted materials. They are among the most common types of volcanoes, in contrast to the less common shield volcanoes. Two famous examples of stratovolcanoes are Krakatoa in Indonesia, known for its catastrophic eruption in 1883, and Vesuvius in Italy, whose catastrophic eruption in AD 79 buried the Roman cities of Pompeii and Herculaneum. Both eruptions claimed thousands of lives. In modern times, Mount St. Helens in Washington State, USA and Mount Pinatubo in the Philippines have erupted catastrophically, but with fewer deaths.

The existence of stratovolcanoes on other bodies of the Solar System has not been conclusively demonstrated. One possible exception is the existence of some isolated massifs on Mars, for example the Zephyria Tholus.

Creation

Stratovolcanoes are common at subduction zones, forming chains and clusters along plate tectonic boundaries where oceanic crust is drawn under continental crust (continental arc volcanism, e.g. Cascade Range, Andes, Campania) or another oceanic plate (island arc volcanism, e.g. Japan, Philippines, Aleutian Islands). The magma forming stratovolcanoes rises when water trapped both in hydrated minerals and in the porous basalt rock of the upper oceanic crust is released into mantle rock of the asthenosphere above the sinking oceanic slab. The release of water from hydrated minerals is termed "dewatering", and occurs at specific pressures and temperatures for each mineral, as the plate descends to greater depths. The water freed from the rock lowers the melting point of the overlying mantle rock, which then undergoes partial melting, rises (due to its lighter density relative to the surrounding mantle rock), and pools temporarily at the base of the lithosphere. The magma then rises through the crust, incorporating silica-rich crustal rock, leading to a final intermediate composition. When the magma nears the top surface, it pools in a magma chamber within the crust below the stratovolcano.

The processes that trigger the final eruption remain a question for further research. Possible mechanisms include:

 Magma differentiation, in which the lightest, most silica-rich magma and volatiles such as water, halogens, and sulfur dioxide accumulate in the uppermost part of the magma chamber. This can dramatically increase pressures.

 Fractional crystallization of the magma. When anhydrous minerals such as feldspar crystallize out of the magma, this concentrates volatiles in the remaining liquid, which can lead to second boiling that causes a gas phase (carbon dioxide or water) to separate from the liquid magma and raise magma chamber pressures.

 Injection of fresh magma into the magma chamber, which mixes and heats the cooler magma already present. This could force volatiles out of solution and lower the density of the cooler magma, both of which increase pressure. There is considerable evidence for magma mixing just before many eruptions, including magnesium-rich olivine crystals in freshly erupted silicic lava that show no reaction rim. This is possible only if the lava erupted immediately after mixing since olivine rapidly reacts with silicic magma to form a rim of pyroxene.

 Progressive melting of the surrounding country rock.

These internal triggers may be modified by external triggers such as sector collapse, earthquakes, or interactions with groundwater. Some of these triggers operate only under limited conditions. For example, sector collapse (where part of the flank of a volcano collapses in a massive landslide) can trigger eruption only of a very shallow magma chamber. Magma differentiation and thermal expansion also are ineffective as triggers for eruptions from deep magma chambers.

Whatever the precise mechanism, the pressure in the magma chamber increases to a critical point where the roof of the magma chamber fractures, and the contents of the magma chamber are provided with a path to the surface through which to erupt.

Hazards

In recorded history, explosive eruptions at subduction zone (convergent-boundary) volcanoes have posed the greatest hazard to civilizations. Subduction-zone stratovolcanoes, such as Mount St. Helens, Mount Etna and Mount Pinatubo, typically erupt with explosive force: the magma is too stiff to allow easy escape of volcanic gases. As a consequence, the tremendous internal pressures of the trapped volcanic gases remain and intermingle in the pasty magma.  Following the breaching of the vent and the opening of the crater, the magma degasses explosively. The magma and gases blast out with high speed and full force.

Since 1600 CE, nearly 300,000 people have been killed by volcanic eruptions. Most deaths were caused by pyroclastic flows and lahars, deadly hazards that often accompany explosive eruptions of subduction-zone stratovolcanoes. Around 30,000 people were killed by pyroclastic flows during the 1902 eruption of Mount Pelée on the island of Martinique in the Caribbean. During March and April of 1982, three explosive eruptions of El Chichón in the State of Chiapas, in southeastern Mexico, caused the worst volcanic disaster in that country's history. Villages within  of the volcano were destroyed by pyroclastic flows, killing more than 2,000 people.

Two Decade Volcanoes that erupted in 1991 provide examples of stratovolcano hazards. On June 15, Mount Pinatubo spewed an ash cloud  into the air and produced huge pyroclastic surges and lahar floods that devastated a large area around the volcano. Unzen is one of more than 75 active volcanoes in Japan; an eruption in 1792 killed more than 15,000 people—the worst volcanic disaster in the nation's history.

The eruption of Mount Vesuvius in 79 completely smothered the nearby ancient cities of Pompeii and Herculaneum with thick deposits of pyroclastic surges and lava flows. Although the death toll has been estimated at between 13,000 and 26,000 people, the exact number is still unclear. Vesuvius is recognized as one of the most dangerous of the world’s volcanoes, due to its capacity for powerful explosive eruptions coupled with the high population density of the surrounding Metropolitan Naples area (totaling about 3.6 million inhabitants).

Ash

In addition to potentially affecting the climate, volcanic clouds from explosive eruptions pose a serious hazard to aviation. For example, during the 1982 eruption of Galunggung in Java, British Airways Flight 9 flew into the ash cloud, causing it to sustain temporary engine failure and structural damage. During the past two decades, more than 60 airplanes, mostly commercial airliners, have been damaged by in-flight encounters with volcanic ash. Some of these encounters have resulted in the loss of power in all engines, necessitating emergency landings. Luckily, to date no crashes have happened because of jet aircraft flying into volcanic ash. Ashfalls are a threat to health when inhaled and ash is also a threat to property with enough accumulation. Dense clouds of hot volcanic ash can be expelled due to the collapse of an eruptive column, or laterally due to the partial collapse of a volcanic edifice or lava dome during explosive eruptions. These clouds can generate devastating pyroclastic flows or surges, which can sweep up everything in their paths.

Lava

Lava flows from stratovolcanoes are generally not a significant threat to humans or animals because the highly viscous lava moves slowly enough for everyone to flee away from the path of flow. The lava flows are more of a threat to property. However, not all stratovolcanoes erupt viscous and sticky lava. Nyiragongo is very dangerous because its magma has an unusually low silica content, making it quite fluid. Lava flows could melt down ice and glaciers that accumulated on the volcano's crater and upper slopes, generating massive lahar flows. Rarely, generally fluid lava could also generate massive lava fountains, while lava of thicker viscosity can solidify within the vent, creating a block which can result in highly explosive eruptions.

Volcanic bombs

Volcanic bombs are extrusive igneous rocks ranging from the size of books to small cars, that are explosively ejected from stratovolcanoes during their climactic eruptive phases. Most bombs do not themselves explode on impact, but rather carry enough force to have destructive effects as if they exploded.

Lahar

Lahars (from a Javanese term for volcanic mudflows) are mixtures of volcanic debris and water. Lahars usually come from two sources: rainfall or the melting of snow and ice by hot volcanic elements, such as lava. Depending on the proportion and temperature of water to volcanic material, lahars can range from thick, gooey flows that have the consistency of wet concrete to fast-flowing, soupy floods. As lahars flood down the steep sides of stratovolcanoes, they have the strength and speed to flatten or drown everything in their paths. The ensuing lahar flooded the city of Armero and nearby settlements, killing 25,000 people.

Effects on climate and atmosphere

As per the above examples, while the Unzen eruptions have caused deaths and considerable local damage in the historic past, the impact of the June 1991 eruption of Mount Pinatubo was global. Slightly cooler-than-usual temperatures were recorded worldwide, with brilliant sunsets and intense sunrises attributed to the particulates; this eruption lofted particles high into the stratosphere. The aerosols that formed from the sulfur dioxide (SO2), carbon dioxide (CO2), and other gases dispersed around the world. The SO2 mass in this cloud—about 22 million tons—combined with water (both of volcanic and atmospheric origin) formed droplets of sulfuric acid, blocking a portion of the sunlight from reaching the troposphere and ground.  The cooling in some regions is thought to have been as much as 0.5 °C (0.9 °F). An eruption the size of Mount Pinatubo tends to affect the weather for a few years; the material injected into the stratosphere gradually drops into the troposphere, where it is washed away by rain and cloud precipitation.

A similar, but extraordinarily more powerful phenomenon occurred in the cataclysmic April 1815 eruption of Mount Tambora on Sumbawa island in Indonesia. The Mount Tambora eruption is recognized as the most powerful eruption in recorded history. Its eruption cloud lowered global temperatures by as much as 3.5 °C (6.3 °F). In the year following the eruption, most of the Northern Hemisphere experienced sharply cooler temperatures during the summer. In parts of Europe, Asia, Africa, and North America, 1816 was known as the "Year Without a Summer", which caused a considerable agricultural crisis and a brief but bitter famine, which generated a series of distresses across much of the affected continents.

List

See also

References

 
Volcanic landforms